Mamadou Coulibaly (born 3 February 1999) is a Senegalese professional footballer who plays as a midfielder for  club Ternana, on loan from Salernitana.

Club career
Coulibaly arrived in Europe in 2015, having trained with Pescara for six months. Pescara announced they had signed Coulibaly on a permanent basis and he made his debut on 19 March 2017 in a 3–0 away loss against Atalanta.

On 12 July, a statement on Udinese's confirmed Coulibaly had put pen to paper on a five-year contract with the Zebrette but would stay with Pescara for the upcoming campaign.

On 22 January 2019, Coulibaly joined Serie B club Carpi on loan until 30 June 2019.

On 1 September 2019, he joined Virtus Entella on loan.

On 13 January 2020, he moved on another loan to Trapani.

He made four appearances for Udinese in the first half of the 2020–21 season, before joining Salernitana in January on loan until June 2021. On 26 July 2021, Coulibaly returned to Salernitana on a new season-long loan, with a conditional obligation to buy.

On 9 August 2022, Coulibaly joined Ternana on loan with an option to buy and a conditional obligation to buy.

Personal life
Coulibaly arrived in Europe in 2015, having fled his native Senegal. He spent a period of time homeless before being spotted by Pescara while playing football with friends.

Career statistics

Club

References

1999 births
Living people
Senegalese Muslims
Sportspeople from Thiès
Association football midfielders
Senegalese footballers
Delfino Pescara 1936 players
A.C. Carpi players
Udinese Calcio players
Virtus Entella players
Trapani Calcio players
U.S. Salernitana 1919 players
Ternana Calcio players
Serie A players
Serie B players
Senegalese expatriate footballers
Senegalese expatriate sportspeople in Italy
Expatriate footballers in Italy